Esther Elizabeth Rolle (November 8, 1920 – November 17, 1998) was an American actress. She is best known for her role as Florida Evans, on the CBS television sitcom Maude, for two seasons (1972–1974), and its spin-off series Good Times, for five seasons (1974–77, 1978–79), for which Rolle was nominated for a Golden Globe Award for Best Actress - Television Series Musical or Comedy in 1976.  In 1979, Rolle won the Emmy Award for Outstanding Supporting Actress in a Limited Series or Special for the television film Summer of My German Soldier.

Early life
Esther Rolle was born in Pompano Beach, Florida to Bahamian immigrants Jonathan Rolle (1883–1953), a farmer, and Elizabeth Iris Rolle (née Dames; 1887–1981). Her parents were both born and raised in Nassau, New Providence, The Bahamas and moved to Florida some time after their marriage. She was the tenth of 18 children (children who included siblings and fellow actresses Estelle Evans and Rosanna Carter). Rolle graduated from  Blanche Ely High School in Pompano Beach, Florida.  She initially studied at Spelman College in Atlanta, before moving to New York City. While in New York, she attended Hunter College before transferring  to The New School and then Yale University in New Haven, Connecticut.  For many years, Rolle worked in a traditional day job in New York City's garment district.

Career

Dance and theater
Rolle was a member of Asadata Dafora's dance troupe, Shogolo Oloba (later renamed the Federal Theater African Dance Troupe). She became the troupe's director in 1960. Rolle's earliest roles were on the stage; her New York stage debut was in the 1962 play The Blacks. She was often cast in plays produced by Robert Hooks and the Negro Ensemble Company. She also appeared in productions of The Crucible and Blues for Mr. Charlie. Rolle's most prominent early role was as Miss Maybell in the Melvin Van Peebles musical film Don't Play Us Cheap, and its subsequent stage adaptation. In 1977, Rolle portrayed Lady Macbeth in Orson Welles' Haitian-influenced version of William Shakespeare's Macbeth at the Henry Street New Federal Theater in Manhattan.

Television
Rolle is best known for her television role as Florida Evans, the character she played on two 1970s sitcoms. The character was introduced as Maude Findlay's housekeeper on Maude, and was spun off in the show's second season into Good Times, a show about Florida's family. Rolle was nominated in 1975 for the Best Actress in a Musical/Comedy Golden Globe Award for her role in Good Times. Rolle was 19 years older than the actor (John Amos) who played her husband James (named Henry on Maude) Evans. The James Evans character was only added after Esther Rolle fought hard for a father figure and husband to be added to the show. Rolle had fought for the father character on the show, more relevant themes and scripts and was unhappy with the success of Jimmie Walker's character, J.J. Evans, which she believed took the show in a frivolous direction. John Amos agreed with Rolle about Walker's character and was fired from the show after the third season ended. Later on, in a stand-off with Good Times producer Norman Lear, Rolle also quit when her contract ended. Although the show continued without her for the fifth season, she returned for the show's final season. In 1979 she won an Emmy for her role in Summer of My German Soldier, a made-for-television movie.

Among her guest-starring roles was one on The Incredible Hulk in an episode entitled "Behind the Wheel", in which she played a taxicab business owner. In the 1990s, Rolle was a surprise guest on RuPaul's VH-1 talk show. Her Maude co-star Bea Arthur was the guest, and Rolle was brought out to surprise Arthur. The two had not seen each other in years, Arthur said, and embraced warmly. Rolle also appeared in a series of psychic hotline TV commercials in the 1990s. "Tell them Esther sent you," was her trademark line.

Music and film
Rolle released an album of music titled The Garden of My Mind in 1975. Rolle's first screen appearance is a small, uncredited role in To Kill a Mockingbird (1962), and she later appeared in Gordon Parks' The Learning Tree (1969). Her sister, actress Estelle Evans, appeared in both films as well. Esther Rolle appeared early in her career in the film Nothing But a Man (1964). After Good Times ended, she appeared in a number of made-for-television movies and films, including Driving Miss Daisy and My Fellow Americans. A memorable role was that of Aunt Sarah in the film Rosewood (1997). She had a major role in I Know Why the Caged Bird Sings based on Maya Angelou's memoir of the same name, and has the distinction of having won the first Emmy Award for the category Outstanding Supporting Actress in a Miniseries or Movie, in 1979, for her work in the television movie Summer of My German Soldier. She is also credited for her role in the film The Mighty Quinn (1989), starring Denzel Washington and Sheryl Lee Ralph, and featuring Robert Townsend. Her last film, Train Ride, was released in 2000 despite being filmed in 1998.

Personal life

Rolle's only marriage was to Oscar Robinson. The two were married from 1955 to 1975. They had no children.

Death
Rolle died on November 17, 1998, in Culver City, California, from complications of diabetes, nine days after her 78th birthday. A devout member of the African Methodist Episcopal Church, Rolle requested that her funeral be held at Bethel African Methodist Episcopal Church. She is buried in Westview Community Cemetery in Pompano Beach, Florida.

The cemetery is a historically black burial ground created in 1952, a time when the laws and customs of Florida did not permit white people and black people to be buried in the same cemetery.

Legacy

Collection of Esther Rolle's personal works
Rolle's family donated over 100 items of hers to the African-American Research Library and Cultural Center in Fort Lauderdale, Florida. The collection includes gowns, a black Raggedy Andy doll she endorsed, a recording of poems recited by Rolle, and awards such as the 1974 NAACP Eighth Image Award for Best Actress in a Series and her 1979 Emmy for her role in Summer of My German Soldier.

Filmography/television

Stage work
 Day of Absence (1965)
 Happy Ending (1965)
 The Amen Corner (1965)
 Man Better Man (1969)
 Akokawe (1970)
 Ride a Black Horse (1971)
 The Dream on Monkey Mountain (1971)
 Rosalee Pritchett (1971)
 Don't Play Us Cheap (1972)
 A Ballet Behind the Bridge (1972)
 Horowitz and Mrs. Washington (1980)
 Nevis Mountain Dew (1980)
 Dame Lorraine (1981)
 A Tragedy of Romeo and Juliet (1982)
 A Raisin in the Sun (1989)
 Member of the Wedding (1989)

References

Notes

  Reprinted as Esther Rolle's Obituary From CNN at sitcomsonline.com

Citations

Sources

External links

 
 
 
 
 Esther Rolle Collection, African American Research Library and Cultural Center, Broward County Library

1920 births
1998 deaths
American film actresses
American stage actresses
American television actresses
American female dancers
Activists for African-American civil rights
Outstanding Performance by a Supporting Actress in a Miniseries or Movie Primetime Emmy Award winners
Savoy Records artists
Blanche Ely High School alumni
Hunter College alumni
Spelman College alumni
The New School alumni
Yale University alumni
Methodists from Florida
American people of Bahamian descent
People from Pompano Beach, Florida
Dancers from Florida
Deaths from diabetes
Burials in Florida
American activists
20th-century American people
20th-century American actresses
20th-century American dancers
20th-century African-American women
20th-century African-American people